Chuhuiv Raion is a raion (district) in Kharkiv Oblast of Ukraine. Its administrative center is the city of Chuhuiv. The population in 2021 was 

On 18 July 2020, as part of the administrative reform of Ukraine, the number of raions of Kharkiv Oblast was reduced to seven, and the area of Chuhuiv Raion was significantly expanded. Three abolished raions, Pechenihy, Vovchansk, and Zmiiv Raions, as well as the city of Chuhuiv, which was previously incorporated as a city of oblast significance and did not belong to the raion, were merged into Chuhuiv Raion. The January 2020 estimate of the raion population was

Subdivisions

Current
After the reform in July 2020, the raion consisted of 9 hromadas:
 Chkalovske settlement hromada with the administration in the urban-type settlement of Chkalovske, retained from Chuhuiv Raion;
 Chuhuiv urban hromada, transferred from Chuhuiv Municipality;
 Malynivka settlement hromada with the administration in the urban-type settlement of Malynivka, retained from Chuhuiv Raion;
 Novopokrovka settlement hromada with the administration in the urban-type settlement of Novopokrovka, retained from Chuhuiv Raion;
 Pechenihy settlement hromada with the administration in the urban-type settlement of Pechenihy, transferred from Pechenihy Raion;
 Slobozhanske settlement hromada with the administration in the urban-type settlement of Slobozhanske, transferred from Zmiiv Raion;
 Staryi Saltiv settlement hromada with the administration in the urban-type settlement of Staryi Saltiv, transferred from Vovchansk Raion; 
 Vovchansk urban hromada with the administration in the city of Vovchansk, transferred from Vovchansk Raion;
 Zmiiv urban hromada with the administration in the city of Zmiiv, transferred from Zmiiv Raion.

Before 2020

Before the 2020 reform, the raion consisted of three hromadas:
 Chkalovske settlement hromada with the administration in  Chkalovske;
 Malynivka settlement hromada with the administration in  Malynivka;
 Novopokrovka settlement hromada with the administration in Novopokrovka.

References 

Raions of Kharkiv Oblast
 
1923 establishments in Ukraine